Your Song Is Good (stylized as YOUR SONG IS GOOD and often abbreviated YSIG) is a Japanese ska band. They are signed to Nayutawave Records (a Universal Music label) and Kakubarhythm.

History 
YSIG began first as punk band School Jackets. Formed in the spring of 1997 by the four members of Nuts & Milk along with former Fruity frontman Jun "JxJx" Saito, the band pioneered a raw, frantic blend of thrash, funk, punk, ska and soul. Saito said that he had wanted to create a blend of The Jackson 5 and Charles Bronson (band). Most songs remained under 1 minute - most under 30 seconds. Despite increasing popularity, the band decided to call it quits and reinvent themselves.

From School Jackets' ashes, Your Song Is Good was born in 1998 with all of the same members intact. They initially took to a melodic hardcore direction influenced by late 1980s DC bands such as Dag Nasty and early 1990s emo . But this again was short-lived and they quickly left this sound behind to reinvent themselves once more as an instrumental post-rock band. Exploring the instrumental form, it was from this state that the band would grow into what they are today. Ska influences from their previous bands - in particular The Specials - would soon resurface and a trombone player (Hattori) would be added to the fold. As their musical goals came into focus, they came to the realization that they may not be ready to play what they heard in their heads. It was at this time that the band went seemingly quiet.

After an extended period of intense practice and honing an entirely new musical direction, Your Song is Good re-emerged. Combining elements from ska, soul, funk and calypso, they distilled their punk energy into a refined and uniquely Japanese sense of melody. Your Song is Good was now a tight and polished dance machine.

Their first properly recorded effort was released in 2002 as a 7-inch EP called "Big Stomach, Big Mouth". This would also serve as the first record on their new label, Kakuba Rhythm. It would prove to be the first crucial step for a band - as well as a label - whose popularity would grow exponentially in the following years.

Timeline 
 1998
 January - Your Song Is Good is formed by members of thrash punk band School Jackets.
 2000
 May - Trombonist Yasuhiko "Shorty" Hattori (ハットリ "ショ～ティ" ヤスヒコ) joins.
 2001
 Bassist Hiyoruki "Daataka" Takada (タカダ "ダ～タカ" ヒロユキ) joins.
 2002
 March - 1st 7-inch EP "Big Stomach, Big Mouth" (KAKU-01) is released on their new label Kakuba Rhythm.
 August - 1st mini-album "Come On" (KAKU-02) is released.
 December - 2nd 7-inch EP "Good Bye/Ka Cuba" (KAKU-03) is released.
 2003
 September - 3rd 7-inch EP "Super Soul Meetin'/Sweet Spot" (KAKU-06) is released.
 2004
 October - 1st full album "Your Song IS Good" (KAKU-010) is released.
 2005
 April - Saito and Toru Hidaka (of Beat Crusaders) take over the video DJ position at Space Shower TV (Studio Grown).
 November - Split 7-inch EP "Your Song Is Good ft Irurime/Mu-Stars ft. Zakkan Morimoto (of BREAKfAST)" (KAKU-016) is released.
 2006
 May 3 - Split album with Beat Crusaders "Booootsy" is released.
 July 5 - Major Label Debut mini-Album "Fever" is released on Universal/Kakuba Rhythm.
 2007
 April 11 - 1st Single "Aitsu Ni Yoroshiku" (あいつによろしく) is released.
 May 16 - 2nd Full Album "Hot!Hot!Hot!Hot!Hot!Hot!" is released on Universal/Kakuba Rhythm.
2008
 April 23 - 2nd single "The ReAction E.P." (Limited Edition with DVD) is released.
 July 23 - 3rd Album " The Action" is released.
2009
May 13 - Live and Documentary 3 disc DVD "PLAY ALL !!!!!! live, accident, history, idea, We are YSIG 1998-2008" is released.
2010
March 3 - 4th full album "B.A.N.D." is released
June 2 - Soundtrack CD "Seaside Motel Original Soundtrack"
December 1 - Live DVD "B.A.N.D.T.O.U.R.FINAL at Hibiya Ongakudo" (B.A.N.D.T.O.U.R.FINAL 日比谷野外大音楽堂)
2011
May 21 - Live CD single "I WANT YOU BACK EP" is released.
October 12 - Greatest hits album "BEST" is released.
2013
November 20 - 5th full album "OUT" is released.

Members

Current 
  - Organ and Vocals
 Name: Born Jun Saito (斉藤淳 / さいとうじゅん) in 1973. From Hyōgo Prefecture. Graduated in Tokyo.
 Ex-Fruity (Vocals and later Drums)/Ex-School Jackets (Vocals).
 Gear: Uses a Hammond XK-2. Initially used a Fender Rhodes.

  - Guitar
 Name： Masatomo Yoshizawa (吉澤成友 / よしざわまさとも)
 Ex-Nuts & Milk (Vocals) / Ex-School Jackets (Vocals & Trombone).
 In charge of Album Art Design and Merchandise Design.
 Gear: Uses several Semi-acoustic guitars, initially used an Epiphone Emperor II. Recently has been using a Fender Stratocaster.

  - Guitar
 Name：Kōji Shiraishi (白石浩二 / しらいしこうじ). From Chiba Prefecture. Graduated in Kisarazu.
 Ex-Nuts & Milk (Guitar)/Ex-School Jackets (Guitar).
 Gear: Fender Telecaster

  - Trombone
 Name: Yasuhiko Hattori (服部康彦 / はっとりやすひこ)
 Joined in 2000. Currently the oldest member of the band.

  - Bass
 Joined in 2001. The third bassist and the youngest member in the band.
 Was a Salaryman but recently quit.

  - Drums
 Ex-Nuts & Milk (Vocals & Drums)/Ex-School Jackets (Drums).

Supporting members 
  Matsui Izumi (松井泉) - Bongos/Percussion (2013 - )

Former 
 Takeo Matsumura (マツムラ タケオ) - Bass (1998-2000)
 Hiroki Moriya (モリヤ ヒロキ) - Bass (2000-2001)

Discography

7" EPs 
Big Stomach, Big Mouth/Love Generation (KAKU-001) - March 2002 **Out of Print**
Good Bye/Ka Cuba (KAKU-003) - December 2002 **Out of Print**
Super Sould Meetin'/Sweet Spot (KAKU-006) - August 2003 **Out of Print**
Your Song Is Good x Irurime (イルリメ)/Mu-Stars x Zakkan Morimoto (森本雑感/Breakfast) (KAKU-016) - November 2005 **Out of Print**

Mini-Album 
Come On (August 9, 2002)
Papa's Groove
10 Inch Stomp
Hot Grapefruit
Shortcake Pt.1
My Melody
Relaxin’

Booootsy (May 3, 2006) Beat Crusaders Split Album
Fool Groove (Your Song Is Good x Beat Crusaders)
Nothing to Loose (Beat Crusaders)
"2.4.6.6.1.64"Number (Beat Crusaders)
Hit in the USA (Your Song Is Good)
Jump Up! Shimbashi! Jump Up! (Your Song Is Good)
Our Melody (Your Song Is Good x Beat Crusaders)

Fever (July 5, 2006)
The Intro (ジ・イントロ～)
Super Soul Meetin’ (超ソウルミーティン～)
Aah Wee: Stomp, Jump & (風呂編～)
Nettai Boy (熱帯ボーイ)
Wah! Wah! Boogie Woogie (わぁわぁブギウギ)
A Short Vacation (ア・ショート・バケイション)
April Sessions (4月の演奏～)
Fever (フィーバー)

Albums 
1. Your Song Is Good (October 6, 2004)
"2,4,6,6,1,64" Number
Splash
Love Generation
Yakiniku Madness
Good Lookin'
Locomotion
Do The Jxjx
Short Cake Pt4
Lovely Yellow
Good Bye
Shinyurigaoka 3a.M.
Up! Up!
Walkin' Walkin'
The Outro

2. Hot!Hot!Hot!Hot!Hot!Hot! (May 16, 2007)
Ooh Weeeeees! Ooh Weeeeees! Ooh Weeeeees! (ウイッス!ウイッス!ウイッス!)
Calypeeeeee! So (笛+カリプソ-)
Aitsu ni 4649 (あいつによろしく)
Nettai Boy Pt 2 (続・熱帯ボーイ)
Honeymoon Shuffle (はねむ～んしゃっふる)
Weekend Strut (週末はストラット)
Shorty's World (ショーティーの世界)
”Six Mens” Goes to the South (6人は南をめざす)
Summer vs Winter (夏 対 冬)
Play It ”Booreiko” (無礼講な演奏)
O.S.T. from ”Walkin' with Maurice” (MOOD for 真昼間)
Boogaloo Super Express (ブガルー超特急)
The Hot-aka Hot! Hot! Hot! Hot! Hot! Hot!
”Oi,Ole,Oh-Mae” Calypso (オイ、オレ、オマエ。)
Now Playing (いつでも演奏中)

3.  The Action! (July 23, 2008)
The Kids Are Alright
A Man from the New Town
Magic Number
Action!!!!!!
Move or Die
I Wanna 再 ! 発 ! Right Now
Enjoy and Joy
I Like It Like That
1-2-3-4! Calypso!
This Planet にて
The Catcher in the Music
The Hey!

4. B.A.N.D. (March 3, 2010)
B.A.N.D.
Deck O Track
Catch-as-Catch-Can
Dance with Me
Fight Back! Fight Back! Fight Back!
We Are
Mr. Everyman
Oniroku
Our Life
Namaensou Shimakuri no Weekend
The Love Song
Unbreakable
Signboarder Trippin'

Singles 
Aitsu Ni Yoroshiku (あいつによろしく) (April 11, 2007)
Aitsu Ni Yoroshiku (TBS series "Count Down TV" Ending) - あいつによろしく TBS「Count Down TV」2007年4度エンディングテーマ）
Bugaru Choutokkyuu (ブガルー超特急)
Fever Mu-Stars Double-Three-Seven-Mix
 The ReAction EP (April 23, 2008)
A Man from the New Town
Move or Die
10Inch Stomp
The Reaction Baby

DVD 

 Play All!!!!!! live, accident, history, idea, We are YSIG 1998-2008 (May 13, 2009 - Released)

Other works 
Sound Sketch (February 5, 2003)
5.Love Generation
Doping Panda "Remixies for 3Years" (September 19, 2003)
2.Tabloid Pubrock (Tabloid Pubrock Is Good Mix: Your Song Is Good)
"Mosh Pit on Disney" (July 28, 2004)
22.Under the Sea
"Rock Motwon" (February 23, 2005)
9.You Can't Hurry Love
Mu-Stars "Check1,2" (November 9, 2005)
16.Funky Soysauce featuring Your Song Is Good
"Husking Bee" (March 21, 2007)
12.後に跡
"アイのうた" (December 5, 2007)
13.オイ、オレ、オマエ。: “Oi,Ole,Oh-Mae” Calypso

External links 
Official Website
Kakubarhythm

Japanese ska groups
Musical groups established in 1998